Ansford Academy, previously known as Ansford School, is a school located in Ansford, which lies on the northern edge of Castle Cary in Somerset, England. The current principal is Rachel Purnell. In July 2011, the school became an Academy.

The redbrick Neo-Georgian main school building was completed in 1940 with additional classrooms for Science, Technology, Modern Languages, Art, ICT and a block for mathematics being added in the 1970/90s.  A new £1.7 million Sports Centre was completed in 2005.

In the school's most recent Ofsted inspection, which took place between the 2nd and 3rd March 2022, a 'good' rating was given for every assessed category including overall effectiveness.

The associated sixth form college for Ansford Academy is Strode College.

References

External links
 

Secondary schools in Somerset
Academies in Somerset
Castle Cary